Grace Violet Blood, also known as Grace Violet, is a fictional character from the third generation of the British teen drama Skins. She is portrayed by Jessica Sula. In Series 5, Grace's story arc revolves around her conflicting social roles — as daughter of arrogant David Blood, as the quieter, more docile friend of Mini McGuinness and Liv Malone, and as the girlfriend, and eventual fiancée of Rich Hardbeck. On a trip to Morocco with her friends in Series 6, Grace is seriously injured in a car crash, the consequences of which set into motion the events of the sixth series.

Characterisation
Grace Blood, who goes by the alias Grace Violet, is the only daughter of David Blood, the headmaster of Roundview College. She is shown to be imaginative, idealistic and endearingly childish, though sometimes bordering on the point of naive, with actress Jessica Sula (who plays Grace) commenting that "[she has]...a kooky, eccentric side" to her personality. However, Grace can also be very level-headed, resourceful and practical minded, as shown in her series 5 episode, where she did not let her friends' personal affairs and conflicts disrupt her theatre production, instead using the tension to harness an effective and successful performance. She is hinted at to be the wallflower of the gang, staying on the sidelines but assessing everything accurately, for example, during a sleepover at her place, when she figured out Franky's attraction to Matty, as also her uneasiness in talking about her sexuality, thus quickly changing the topic.

Grace is depicted to be culturally aware and very fond of literature and the arts; in her official Skins page, this is clearly visible as she lists a variety of classics as her favourites, like Lolita, Great Expectations, Wuthering Heights, Little Women and works by Jane Austen. She is fond of Shakespearean drama and loves romantic films and musicals, citing Moulin Rouge!, Casablanca and Grease as some examples. Grace herself is a theatre performer and a talented ballet dancer, as evident from Rich's series 5 episode, where her dance recital moved him to tears. She states that her lifelong ambition is  "..to be cast as Odette in Swan Lake, with The Royal Ballet... because you get to play the black swan and the white swan." Her ideal man is Mr. Darcy. In her Skins page, she also talks in lengthy details about her love for cats and everything Disney-related.

In an interview with E4 dated March, 2011, Sula describes her character thus:".....She is quite unique. She is very elegant. She likes her 1960s, Audrey Hepburn / Grace Kelly style. She's a romantic. At the same time she can be quite naive as to what's going on around her, or she likes to think she's not aware of issues going on around her. She likes to block them out and believe that everything is a fairytale fantasy world....She's quite sensible in her own strange way. I think she is there to remind the group sometimes, "Are you sure you want to do this? Think about it." But she also brings a lightheartedness and she is kind to everyone, so I think she is a bridge builder. She will try and fix things."In contrast to the hedonistic, promiscuous and wild nature of typical Skins characters, Grace is portrayed as responsible, sweet-tempered, and goal-oriented. Being brought up by her strict father, David Blood, she is far more conservative and practical than the more rebellious Mini and Liv. Noteworthy, she is one of the few Skins characters who are never seen smoking in any scene, and the only romantic relationship she has in the entire show is with her boyfriend, Rich Hardbeck. She is also often cited to be very beautiful, not just by Rich but by other members of the gang, including Alo, who calls her one of the most attractive people in their college.

Synopsis

Series 5
In "Franky", Grace is introduced as one of Mini McGuinness's friends. Unlike Mini and Liv, however, she takes an immediate liking to Franky, whose quiet, isolated nature immediately earns her sympathy. She accompanies the gang on a trip to the local shopping centre, where she robs a store. After escaping the police, Mini, Liv and Grace go to Franky's house, where they discover some embarrassing pictures of Franky have been left on her social networking account. Later, she is dismayed when Mini has the pictures pasted onto the walls of the school, and when Franky returns home, she discovers Grace has come to apologise personally. Grace appeals to Franky to come to Mini's party. At the party, Franky confronts Mini, but Grace cannot bring herself to say anything against Mini. Instead, she gets Alo and Rich to kidnap Franky and take her to the local swimming pool, and they bond as a gang of their own.

In Rich, Franky recommends Grace help Rich learn to interact with girls, due to his own shyness around them. Rich is very much against the idea at first, because Grace "represents everything he despises in the world"-feminine, soft-spoken and dreamy as she is. He also makes constant rude remarks and sexist comments to her that get on her nerves. Eventually, though, she is able to use her acting skills to transform herself into a cynical metalhead very much like Rich, and is able to quote some of his favourite bands. But Rich, though impressed, tells her that her meek nature allows her friends to walk all over her, to her offense. Rich is ultimately unsuccessful in chatting up a girl he likes, and Grace immediately takes the opportunity to ask Rich out. But he turns her down, and Grace is distraught. However, soon after, Rich has a change of heart after getting deafened by a record and watching a beautiful ballet performance of hers. She then takes him to a Napalm Death concert, at which they have a good time. Although Grace is reluctant to let Mini and Liv know she has feelings for Rich, they agree to remain in touch.

In Mini, Grace recruits the help of Franky to organise the dresses for the charity fashion show Roundview is organising, but their reasonable ideas are laughed at by Mini who, out of pure pride and arrogance, decides to overhaul the show to match her own ideas. She continues to insult Grace after the meeting, who is offended by Mini's unkindness and stops being her friend. She then forms a relationship with Rich, and they share a kiss at the after-show rave.

In Alo, Grace and Rich turn up at the party that Alo has arranged at his farmhouse (in order to spite his domineering parents). There, they secretly make a plan to have sex that night, for the first time. Alo turns up at Rich's house after his father has a heart attack, but cannot bring himself to burden Rich with his troubles, due to Rich's elation at having finally had sex with Grace.

In Grace, Rich is aghast to discover that Grace's father is David Blood, the snobbish, pushy headmaster of Roundview College. David is less than impressed to discover that Grace is in a relationship with Rich, whom he perceives to be below his family, and decides that it is time she is sent back to Mayberry's College, an all-girls' boarding school where Grace originally attended. Grace is upset, and persuades him to compromise, and he agrees to let her stay at Roundview if she gets good marks in her AS Theatre Studies exam, a production of Twelfth Night. However, Blood intends to sabotage her play by persuading Rich to do badly on purpose, with the promise of recommending his father, a low-ranking Civil Servant, for the position of Headmaster of Roundview College when he leaves. Grace's production is also marred by the love triangle formed between Liv, Matty and Franky, whose conflict spills out onto the play when Liv makes Matty quit.

Grace, at the advice of her mother and after identifying with Hamlet in his Sea of Troubles soliloquy ("To be, or not to be"), decides to instead force Matty and Liv to rejoin the play, and makes it more interesting by including a kiss between Olivia and Cesario, forcing Mini, and later Liv, to kiss Franky. Rich agrees to have dinner with the Bloods, which is uncomfortable at best, and notes to her that she is a different person around her father. Despite their success in the play, however, Blood decides that Grace must return to Mayberry's anyway, to her fury. Her mother's effort to console her is unsuccessful, and merely results in Grace deriding the fairy tales and children's stories her mother used to read to her. However, at that moment, Rich turns up outside Grace's room, creating a re-enactment of a scene from Romeo and Juliet, and asks her to marry him. Grace agrees and responds with Miranda's soliloquy in The Tempest.

In Everyone, Grace and Rich put their wedding into action, and arrange one just outside Bristol, forging her father's signature onto a form in order to make it legal. Unfortunately, Alo (the driver) has not brought a proper map with him, and gets lost in a secluded forest with his van damaged. Grace and Rich hitch a ride to the church, arriving just in time to get a later slot. Fearing their friends won't show up, they recruit an elderly couple to be their witnesses. However, the gang does eventually show up, but so does Professor Blood, who had placed a tracking bug in a brooch he gave Grace. Blood is eventually talked down by Nick Levan, and sullenly agrees to let the ceremony continue. But Rich and Grace decide they no longer need to marry, and leave their relationship at that.

Series 6
In Everyone, Grace and Rich travel to Morocco, for a holiday with the rest of the gang. The two find themselves having to sleep on the roof, but Grace is optimistic as ever, and enjoys the holiday. However, tragedy strikes when Franky goes off with Luke, a British drug dealer on holiday, who blackmails Matty to deliver some cannabis into Marrakech. Grace, Liv and Matty instead get into Matty's car and chase Luke's vehicle. Matty's dangerously fast driving eventually results in a severe car accident that injures Liv and mortally injures Grace. Matty flees the scene, knowing that he will most likely be arrested if he is caught, and the last thing he sees is Grace's bloodied, almost-lifeless body in the ruins of his car. Grace is transferred to a hospital in Britain, and David Blood has refused Rich, or anyone in the gang, permission to see her, although a sympathetic nurse manages to smuggle Grace a CD of Rich's, which she had previously recorded vocals for.

In Rich, Rich has been waiting for ages for Grace to come out of her coma, and making every effort to sneak past David Blood to see her. One day, he receives a phone call from her, and rushes to the hospital, where Grace is seemingly all right. As they are about to get intimate, Blood enters and has Rich escorted from the premises, telling him that he is having Grace taken to Switzerland. When Rich attempts to reason with him later, he arrives to discover that the Bloods have left. Distraught, Rich breaks into their house and squats there, occupying his time by doing drugs, practicing with his and Alo's band, and watching Grace's baby videos. His attempts to reach Grace in Switzerland fail, as Blood merely intercepts the call, but he later receives another call from her, and arranges to meet her in Paris. The gang decide to hold a fundraiser in the Bloods' house to raise money for a trip to Paris, which results in the house getting trashed. During the party, however, Rich sees Grace in the crowd, and follows her upstairs, where they have sex. The next day, however, Rich wakes up to discover the room empty. He receives a final call from Grace, who cryptically tells him that she has to go, and that "it's so beautiful out here." Confused, he looks at the phone and discovers it is actually broken. He goes back inside, where David Blood has returned. Blood explains that Grace had never come out of her coma (revealing that Rich's visions of her were hallucinations) and tearfully informs him that Grace has died.

In Alex, a memorial service is held in honour of Grace at the college, however, her friends are put off by all the fake mourners who never really knew her. Mini reacts hostilely to Alex because she thinks Liv is attempting to use him as a substitute for Grace.

In Franky, Grace appears as a vision before Franky, in a playground. Later, consumed by guilt, Franky has a meltdown at therapy repeatedly screaming "I'm sorry!" presumably for having indirectly caused the death of her best friend.

In Liv, Liv mourns her friend privately, and sorrow, coupled with fear of dying causes her to feel a psychosomatic lump on her stomach. Her anger causes her to lash out at Mini, who she thinks is not devastated enough by Grace's loss, as well as Franky and Matty, both of whom she holds to be culpable for the accident. The episode ends with Liv, her sister Maude, Rich and Doug, a teacher at Roundview, paying a visit to Grace's grave and watching old videos shot by her.

In Mini and Franky, Rich tells Alo about how he often wondered what would happen if he and Grace ever had a family of their own, prompting Alo to make it up with Mini, who is pregnant with his child.

In Everyone, Rich, while at Alex's farewell party has a vision of Grace sitting at the same swimming pool where they'd first bonded in series 5. The two dive underwater, where they kiss, following which Grace disappears. This is her last appearance.

The fact that Grace was going to die was foreshadowed in several ways:
 In her episode in series 5, Grace, unable to deal with the stress of work and relationships, has a breakdown when she smashes a mirror, a superstition which is said to bring upon the individual seven years of bad luck.
 In the same episode when Rich asks her where she is off to, she angrily retorts, "....[to a]castle in the clouds!"
 Grace and Rich have many parallels to Shakespeare's Romeo and Juliet, a common trope used in media to denote a doomed relationship.
 Grace had written a short story named "The Dancer and the Metal Man", a symbolic tale about her relationship with Rich, which was loosely based on Andersen's The Steadfast Tin Soldier. The original story ends with both the dolls being charred to death as the price of staying together.
 In an "Unseen Skins" episode, Rich and Grace go for a zombie film marathon. Soon after, under the effect of alcohol, they collectively experience a nightmare where zombies ravage the streets, ultimately fatally maiming Grace. The short ends with Rich and Grace deciding to visit Morocco to relieve themselves of boredom.
 Just before they head to the beach party culminating in the car crash, Grace and Rich have a discussion about how each of them would react if the other died.
 Rich's series 6 episode is replete in foreshadowing. Shortly before she makes love to Rich, Grace talks about how she has left her father behind because "he...couldn't get past things."
Grace's death is a major blow to the gang, and results in many of them going off the rails - Franky gets herself involved with Luke's organised street fighting, Liv embarks on a wild-living lifestyle with her new friend, Alex Henley, Mini attempts to reconnect with her wealthy father and ends up getting pregnant, Nick and Matty find themselves at odds over Franky, and Alo accidentally commits statutory rape. The gang eventually manage to move on from her death after Mini's baby is born, whom she names Grace after her deceased friend, and the series ends with Rich staring heavenwards and saying goodbye to her.

Reception 
The reception towards the character has been generally positive, especially the romantic arc with Rich. Grace has featured in many Top 10 Skins Character lists, with online forum Cultbox mentioning that, "Keeping cynicism and peer pressure at bay with her butter-wouldn’t-melt smile, Grace plays a key, almost exclusive role in bringing the outcasts and the cool kids together to form the class of 2011-2012." Television blog Rophydoes praised the fact that Grace "defies the manic pixie girl stereotype.....She’s actually awfully smart, and not just in the dreamy way where she reads Sartre and finds the hope in it. Grace is smart in the way where she’s smarter than everyone else around her, and not above using that to her advantage." While criticising certain aspects of Series 6, a reviewer noted that killing off Grace was a mis-step as she "was this [the third generation's] bright spot." A Buzzfeed article dated 2015, ranked Rich and Grace as Number 1 out of all the Skins couples, calling them "one of the most perfect couples ever."

References

Skins (British TV series) characters
Television characters introduced in 2011
Fictional ghosts
Fictional ballet dancers
Fictional dancers
Fictional Black British people
Fictional English people
 British female characters in television
Female characters in television
Teenage characters in television